"Inflatable" is a song by alternative rock band Bush and the final single from their fourth album Golden State. "Inflatable" could not be included on future compilations such as The Best of '94–'99 due to lack of licensing rights.

The song's chorus has a lyric inspired by a line from the Pixies song "Bone Machine". Bone Machine features the line 'You're so pretty when you're faithful to me', while Gavin Rossdale sings 'So pretty when you're faithful'. It was mutual appreciation of the Pixies that drew founding members Gavin Rossdale and Nigel Pulsford together.

The song bears some resemblance to previous Bush hits "Glycerine" and "Letting the Cables Sleep" in that it is more subdued than the band's other singles. However, it is the only Bush song to feature an acoustic guitar.

The song is the last single featuring the four original members of the band and it would be the last single to be released under the Bush name for almost 9 years until 2010 when "Afterlife" was released.

The song was featured in the TV series 7th Heaven and Smallville.

Promotion 
Rossdale and new guitarist Chris Traynor performed the song acoustically on the short-lived show Late World with Zach in 2002.

Music video
Inflatable was the last Bush song prior to their 2010 "The Sea of Memories" to feature a music video and was directed by Giuseppe Capotondi. Guitarist Pulsford was absent from the video as he had left the band a month before. Rossdale's initial vision was for the video to be set at a wedding ceremony for a young conscript about to leave for the Vietnam war. However, Rossdale was concerned that he would be seen as capitalising on his own impending wedding to Gwen Stefani and so instead the video was set at a leaving party. The band can be seen performing on stage while people dance. Later a brawl outbreaks but the band continue to perform undisturbed in a tranquil manner in fitting with the mood of the song. The video was filmed in London at the Lambeth Liberal & Radical club. The video featured the famous Russian couple and actors Zhanna and Sergei.

Track listing
UK CD Single
 "Inflatable" (Radio remix) - 4:05
 "Headful of Ghosts" (Live) - 4:37
 "Hurricane" (Live) - 3:29

US CD Single
 "Inflatable" (Radio remix) - 4:05
 "Inflatable (Album version) - 4:22

GER CD Single
 "Inflatable" (Radio remix) - 4:05
 "Headful of Ghosts" (Live) - 4:37
 "Hurricane" (Live) - 3:29

References

https://web.archive.org/web/20120328054115/http://onesecondbush.com/bush/music/discography/golden-state
http://onesecondbush.com/bush/press/_24/

External links
 Bush Fansite

2002 singles
Bush (British band) songs
Songs written by Gavin Rossdale
Song recordings produced by Dave Sardy